Sieme Zijm (born 25 January 1978 in Den Helder, North Holland) is a former Dutch footballer who last played for FC Emmen. His former clubs are Go Ahead Eagles, FC Zwolle, Sparta Rotterdam, Excelsior Rotterdam and FC Dordrecht.

See also
 Sparta Rotterdam season 2001–02

References
Profile

1978 births
Living people
Dutch footballers
AZ Alkmaar players
PEC Zwolle players
Excelsior Rotterdam players
Sparta Rotterdam players
Go Ahead Eagles players
FC Emmen players
FC Dordrecht players
Eredivisie players
Eerste Divisie players
People from Den Helder
Association football defenders 
Association football midfielders